The cuneiform sign mu, is a common-use sign of the Amarna letters, the Epic of Gilgamesh, and other cuneiform texts (for example Hittite texts). It is also used as MU.

Linguistically, it has the alphabetical usage in texts for m, or u, or syllabically for mu. The u is replaceable in word formation by any of the 4 vowels: a, e, i, or u.

One reason for the high usage of mu in the Amarna letters is for the word: "peace", or "be safe", Akkadian language šalāmu, for "to be sound, whole, safe". It is used especially between the Great King letters.

Epic of Gilgamesh usage
The mu sign usage in the Epic of Gilgamesh is as follows: mu-(266 times); MU-(87).

References

Moran, William L. 1987, 1992. The Amarna Letters. Johns Hopkins University Press, 1987, 1992. 393 pages.(softcover)
 Parpola, 1971. The Standard Babylonian Epic of Gilgamesh, Parpola, Simo, Neo-Assyrian Text Corpus Project, c 1997, Tablet I thru Tablet XII, Index of Names, Sign List, and Glossary-(pp. 119–145), 165 pages.

Cuneiform signs